MVR or MvR may refer to:

Codes 
 Maldivian rufiyaa, Maldives currency by ISO 4217 code
 Salak Airport, Maroua, Far North Province, Cameroon
 Marau language of Indonesian Papua, ISO 639-3 code
 IBM RPG II programming language "Move Remainder" operation code

Organizations 
 Fifth Republic Movement, a Venezuelan political party
 Transports Montreux–Vevey–Riviera, a Swiss railway operator

Science and technology 
 Mechanical vapor recompression, an energy recovery process;
 Melt Volume(-flow) Rate, a measure of the ease of flow of the melt of a thermoplastic polymer.

Transportation 
 Meon Valley Railway, cross-country railway 1903–1968, Hampshire, England
 Moors Valley Railway
 Mary Valley Rattler, a heritage railway line conducting steam train tours from Gympie to Amamoor (formerly Imbil).

Miscellaneous 
 Market Value Reduction, used by insurance companies
 Mound Visits Remaining, in baseball